Nurabad-e Simineh (also Romanized as Nūrābād-e Sīmīneh; also known as Darreh Ghūl, Darreh Qūl, Darreh-ye Ghūl, and Nūrābād) is a village in Simineh Rud Rural District, in the Central District of Bahar County, Hamadan Province, Iran. At the 2006 census, its population was 434, in 98 families.

References 

Populated places in Bahar County